Pseudicius flabellus is a species of jumping spider in the genus Pseudicius that lives in South Africa. The male of the species was first described in 2013.

References

Endemic fauna of South Africa
Salticidae
Spiders described in 2013
Spiders of South Africa
Taxa named by Wanda Wesołowska